Hypselobarbus pulchellus is a critically endangered species of ray-finned fish in the genus Hypselobarbus. It is currently only recorded in the Dakshina Kannada district of Karnataka, India.

Footnotes

References

Hypselobarbus
Fish described in 1870